MCRI may refer to:
 Michigan Civil Rights Initiative
 Murdoch Children's Research Institute
 McCrone Research Institute